Emilio Dutra e Mello (born 12 May 1955) is a Brazilian archer. He competed at the 1980, 1984, 1988 and the 1992 Summer Olympics.

References

1955 births
Living people
Brazilian male archers
Olympic archers of Brazil
Archers at the 1980 Summer Olympics
Archers at the 1984 Summer Olympics
Archers at the 1988 Summer Olympics
Archers at the 1992 Summer Olympics
Sportspeople from Rio de Janeiro (city)
Pan American Games medalists in archery
Pan American Games bronze medalists for Brazil
Archers at the 1983 Pan American Games
Medalists at the 1983 Pan American Games
20th-century Brazilian people